Nie zatrzymasz mnie (English: You won't stop me) is the second single by singer Ewa Sonnet. It is the biggest Ewa's hit to date. The song was originally released on the album "Nielegalna" under a title "Choćbyś zamknął wszystkie drzwi..." (Eng. "Even if you'll close all the doors...") but was remixed for its single release.

Track list 
Nie Zatrzymasz Mnie (final radio edit) 3:50
Nie Zatrzymasz Mnie (radio edit) 3:50
Nie Zatrzymasz Mnie (Club Deejays radio edit) 3:34
Nie Zatrzymasz Mnie (Jam Boxx mix) 4:10
Nie Zatrzymasz Mnie (R'n'B edit) 4:04
Nie Zatrzymasz Mnie (Kinky Man mix) 3:24
Nie Zatrzymasz Mnie (album mix) 4:30
Nie Zatrzymasz Mnie (Club Deejays extended mix) 7:56
Nie Zatrzymasz Mnie (instrumental) 3:48

Personnel

References 

2006 singles
Ewa Sonnet songs
2006 songs